Bachelors (Lisanseha) is an Iranian drama and comedy television series. The series is directed by Soroush Sehhat.

Storyline 
Three young bachelors each has problems. One is thinking about immigration, one is looking to make a living, and one is looking for housing. Maziyar Rahmati (Amir Kazemi) lives in a broken family. His parents are divorced and his father is addicted, and he himself is thinking of migrating, then he realizes that he has cancer and can no longer migrate. Habib Naghavi (Hootan Shakiba) is a rich man who is very interested in marriage but due to his weakness in establishing social relations, he has not been able to choose a wife yet. Masoud Sharifian (Amir Hossein Rostami) on the eve of marrying Taraneh (Matin Sotoudeh) both needs some money for housing and is looking for a job, On the other hand, he has disagreements with his father-in-law (Bijan Banafshehkhah). The story revolves around the problems of these three people and strange events.

Cast 
 Hootan Shakiba
 Amir Hossein Rostami
 Bijan Banafshehkhah
 Afshin Sangchap
 Behnam Tashakkor
 Bizhan Emkanian
 Mehran Rajabi
 Amir Kazemi
 Roya Mirelmi
 Ateneh Faghih Nasiri
 Matin Sotoudeh
 Ezzatollah Mehravaran
 Tabasom Hashemi
 Kazem Sayahi
 Sam Derakhshani
 Sogol Ghalatian
 Farkhondeh Farmanizadeh
 Maryam Sarmadi
 Siavash Cheraghipour
 Ardeshir Kazemi
 Erfan Barzin
 Neda Nouri

References

External links
 

2010s Iranian television series
Iranian drama television series
Iranian comedy television series